Bloomfield is an unincorporated community in Bearcreek Township, Jay County, Indiana.

History
The first post office in Bearcreek Township was established at Bloomfield in 1840.

Geography

References

Unincorporated communities in Jay County, Indiana
Unincorporated communities in Indiana